A Theology of Liberation is a 1971 book by the Peruvian Roman Catholic theologian Gustavo Gutiérrez. The book was foundational to the development of liberation theology, a term coined by Gutiérrez in his 1968 lecture "Hacia una teología de la liberación" ('Towards a theology of liberation').

Originally published in Spanish, the work has been translated into nine languages . The first English translation was made by Caridad Inda and John Eagleson. The translation sold over 50,000 copies in the twenty months following its publication in 1973.

References

Footnotes

Bibliography

 
 

1971 non-fiction books
Christian theology books
Liberation theology
Peruvian non-fiction books
Spanish-language books